Eric Hansen is an American drummer from Oklahoma, United States, who has performed with Sunday Afternoon, Whitey, Medicine Show Caravan, Medicine Show, Jimmy LaFave, Hadden Sayers, Mike McClure Band,
and Cody Canada and the Departed.

Hansen has recorded also with Bob Childers, Tom Skinner, Greg Jacobs, Farmboy, and Stoney LaRue.

References

American drummers
Living people
Year of birth missing (living people)
Musicians from Oklahoma